The Pierre Shale is a geologic formation or series in the Upper Cretaceous which occurs east of the Rocky Mountains in the Great Plains, from Pembina Valley in Canada to New Mexico.

The Pierre Shale was described by Meek and Hayden in 1862 in the Proceedings of the Academy of Sciences (Philadelphia).  They described it as a dark-gray shale, fossiliferous, with veins and seams of gypsum, and concretions of iron oxide.  The Pierre Shale is about 700 feet (210m) thick at the type locality.  It overlies the Niobrara division and underlies the Fox Hills beds. It was named for an occurrence near Fort Pierre on the Missouri River in South Dakota.

The Pierre Shale is of marine origin and was deposited in the Western Interior Seaway.  It is correlative with other marine shales that occur farther west, such as the Bearpaw Shale, Mancos Shale and the Lewis Shale. It correlates with the Lea Park Formation in central Alberta.  The Pierre is overlain by marginal marine deposits of the Fox Hills Formation.

Most of the formation was deposited in the Campanian Age of the late Cretaceous. However, the discovery of fossils of Baculites baculus in the uppermost beds of the Pierre Shale in the Raton, New Mexico area show that deposition continued here into the early Maastrichtian.

Mineral resources
The Pierre Shale is the host formation for commercial petroleum deposits in the Florence and Canon City fields in Fremont County, Colorado, and the Boulder Oil Field in Boulder County, Colorado.  More recently, natural gas has been extracted in the Raton Basin in southern Colorado. The shale formation is usually too impermeable for hydrocarbon extraction, but produces in areas where it is naturally fractured or fractured by artificial means.

Paleofauna

Reptiles

Dinosaurs

Mosasaurs

Plesiosaurs
{| class="wikitable" align="center"
|-
! colspan="7" align="center" | Plesiosaurs reported from the Pierre Shale Formation
|-
! Genus !! Species !! Location 
!Stratigraphic position
!Material!! Notes !! Images
|-
|style="background:#E6E6E6;" rowspan=2|Alzadasaurus
|style="background:#E6E6E6;"|A. pembertonii
|style="background:#E6E6E6;"|South Dakota.
|style="background:#E6E6E6;"|Sharon Springs Member.
|style="background:#E6E6E6;"|Complete specimen (SDSM 451).
|style="background:#E6E6E6;"|Synonymized with Styxosaurus snowii.
|style="background:#E6E6E6;"|
|-
|style="background:#E6E6E6;"|cf. A. pembertonii
|style="background:#E6E6E6;"|Manitoba.
|style="background:#E6E6E6;"|Pembina Member.
|style="background:#E6E6E6;"|A specimen consisting of two femora, one humerus, two epipodials, fragments of the pelvic girdle and 14 vertebrae (MDM P83.02. 18).
|style="background:#E6E6E6;"|Synonymized with Styxosaurus snowii.
|style="background:#E6E6E6;"|
|-
|Dolichorhynchops
|D. bonneri
|Wyoming & South Dakota.
|Sharon Springs Member and Pembina Member.
|2 specimens: an adult (UNSM 50133) and a juvenile (UNSM 55810), and several others.
|A polycotylid.
|
|-
|rowspan=2|Elasmosauridae
|Gen. et. sp. indeterminate
|Manitoba.
|Pembina Member.
|
|Remains undiagnostic at the generic level.
|
|-
|
|Logan County, Kansas.
|Upper Sharon Springs Member.
|KUVP  129744, a specimen associated with 47 gastroliths.
|An elasmosaurid too fragmentary to identify below the family level.
|
|-
|rowspan=2|Elasmosaurus
|E. platyurus
| Kansas.
|Sharon Springs member.
|Multiple specimens, including the holotype.
| An elasmosaurid.
|
|-
|?E. sp.
|Manitoba.
|Pembina Member.
|"An incomplete specimen (TMP P84.162.4), consisting of pelvic girdle, distal end of a propodial, an epipodial and 21 vertebrae".
|
|
|-
|Plesiosauria
|Fam., gen. et. sp. indeterminate
|
|Pembina Member.
|"Specimens consisting mostly of ribs, caudal vertebrae, broken girdle plates and phalanges".
|"Further identification is not possible due to poor preservation and the incomplete nature of the material".
|
|-
|'Plesiosaurus'''
|'P.' gulo|Western Kansas.
|
|KUVP 1329 (the original specimen consisted of "eleven cervical, thirteen dorsal, and seven or eight other vertebrae" but now only 3 vertebrae remain).
|An elasmosaurid associated with the remains of a mosasaur (likely Clidastes), representing the stomach contents of the plesiosaur.
|
|-
|Polycotylidae
|Gen. et. sp. indeterminate
|Morden area, Manitoba.
|Pembina Member.
|Many isolated vertebrae and partial skull remains.
|A polycotylid.
|
|-
|Serpentisuchops|S. pfisterae|Wyoming.
|Upper half of the upper member.
|"Specimen GPM5001".
|A polycotylid.
|
|-
| rowspan="3" |Styxosaurus|S. snowii|South Dakota.
|Sharon Springs Member.
|Complete specimen (SDSM 451).
|An elasmosaurid originally reported as Alzadasaurus pembertoni.
|
|-
|cf. S. snowii|Manitoba.
|Pembina Member.
|A specimen consisting of two femora, one humerus, two epipodials, fragments of the pelvic girdle and 14 vertebrae (MDM P83.02. 18).
|An elasmosaurid originally reported as cf. Alzadasaurus pembertoni.
|
|-
|
|Kansas.
|Sharon Springs member.
|NJSM 15435.
|An elasmosaurid tentatively assigned to the genus Styxosaurus.
|
|-
| rowspan="3" |Trinacromerum|style="background:#fbdddb;" |T. bonneri|style="background:#fbdddb;" |Wyoming & South Dakota.
|style="background:#fbdddb;" |Sharon Springs Member and Pembina Member.
|style="background:#fbdddb;" |2 specimens: an adult (UNSM 50133) and a juvenile (UNSM 55810), and several others.
|style="background:#fbdddb;" |Now moved to the genus Dolichorhynchops.
|style="background:#fbdddb;" |
|-
|T. cf. T. kirki|Manitoba.
|Pembina Member.
|TMP P84.162.3.
|A polycotylid.
|
|-
|T. sp.
|Manitoba.
|Pembina Member.
|Many poorly preserved specimens.
|A polycotylid.
|
|}

Turtles

Fish

Bony fish

Cartilaginous fish

Marine vertebrates
 Gillicus Pseudocorax Carcharias''

Invertebrates

Annelids

Arthropods

Bivalves

Brachiopods

Cephalopods

Echinoderms

Gastropods

Scaphopods

References

Upper Cretaceous Series of North America
Cretaceous Alberta
Cretaceous Colorado
Cretaceous Kansas
Cretaceous Montana
Cretaceous geology of Nebraska
Cretaceous formations of New Mexico
Cretaceous geology of South Dakota
Cretaceous geology of Wyoming
Campanian Stage
Shale formations of the United States
Shale formations
Oil-bearing shales in Canada
Oil-bearing shales in the United States
Great Plains